Ye Li (born November 20, 1981) is a Chinese professional basketball player who played for the China women's national basketball team at the 2004 Summer Olympics.

Ye met Chinese basketball player Yao Ming at the age of seventeen in 1998. They married on August 6, 2007. Ye gave birth to their daughter Yao Qinlei (whose English name is Amy) in Houston, Texas on May 21, 2010.

References

1981 births
Living people
Basketball players at the 2004 Summer Olympics
Olympic basketball players of China
Basketball players from Shanghai
Chinese women's basketball players
Shanghai Swordfish players